Tepetotutla Chinantec (Chinanteco de Santa Cruz Tepetotutla) is a minor Chinantecan language of Mexico, spoken in northern Oaxaca in the towns of Santa Cruz Tepetotutla, San Antonio del Barrio, San Pedro Tlatepusco, Santo Tomás Texas, Vega del Sol, and El Naranjal. It has 60% intelligibility with Quiotepec Chinantec and Palantla Chinantec.

References

Chinantec languages